Witch is the collaborative extended play by American rappers Gangsta Boo and La Chat. It was released on May 27, 2014 via Phixieous Entertainment. Recording sessions took place at Select-O-Hits Studio in Memphis. The album features guest appearances from Fefe Dobson, Lil Wyte and Jelly Roll.

Track listing

References

2014 EPs
Gangsta Boo albums
Collaborative albums
Albums produced by WLPWR
Albums produced by Drumma Boy
La Chat albums